National School District is a public elementary schools district based in National City, in the South Bay region of San Diego County, California.

In addition to almost all of National City, the district includes a small section of San Diego and a small piece of Chula Vista.

References

External links
 

National City, California
School districts in San Diego County, California
Education in Chula Vista, California
Education in San Diego